Charles Elliot Allen (October 14, 1880 – January 15, 1966) was an Irish rugby union forward. He played 21 matches for the Irish national team. He was born in Gibraltar.

External links
Scrum

1880 births
1966 deaths
Irish rugby union players
Gibraltarian rugby union players
Ireland international rugby union players
Rugby union forwards